Trindade (Portuguese for the Trinity) is a town located on São Tomé Island, which is part of the island nation of São Tomé and Príncipe. Its population is 16,140 (2012 census). It is the seat of Mé-Zóchi District. It lies 7 km southwest of the capital São Tomé. Nearby places include Diogo Simão to the northeast, Lemos to the east, Cruzeiro to the south and Piedade to the west. There is a secondary school in Trindade, opened in 2011, with a capacity of 720 students.

During the Batepá massacre, a brutally crushed rebellion in February 1953, hundreds of inhabitants of Trindade and nearby Batepá were killed.

Population history

Notable people
Almada Negreiros, painter and artist
Aldair Santos, footballer

References

Populated places in Mé-Zóchi District